Moishes Steakhouse was one of the oldest restaurants in Montreal, Quebec, Canada. Founded in 1938 by Moishe Lighter, it was initially called "Romanian Paradise." Legend has it that Lighter, an immigrant from Romania to Canada, became the owner of the restaurant in a card game. The restaurant's name was changed to "Moishe's" at the outset of World War II. The apostrophe was dropped in the 1970s. The restaurant had been a fixture of Montreal and "The Main" neighborhood of Montreal today. The Main and its residents are prominent in Montreal literature and culture, as most famously represented in the writing of Montreal's Mordecai Richler. (Richler himself was a long-time Moishes client, and the restaurant had featured prominently in much of his work.)

The restaurant had been in its location at 3961 Saint Laurent Boulevard since its founding, in an area that was the historic Jewish quarter. Identified as a "Jewish steakhouse," its menu was based on traditional Old World recipes, and it catered to the mainly Central European immigrant residents of The Main neighbourhood. The influence of Romanian cuisine has had a significant shaping influence on the culinary culture of Montreal, producing, among other staples, the Montreal-style steak spice, bagels and smoked meat for which the city has become known.

History
The restaurant was founded in 1938 by Moishe Lighter, a Romanian immigrant.

In 2018 Moishes was sold to the Sportscene Group, owner of La Cage aux Sports sportsbar chain. Sportscene also acquired all Moishes trademarks, branding and the line of products sold at grocery stores. The restaurant would remain as Moishes and open at its location after the change in ownership.

In March 2020, the steakhouse closed its doors by government order due to the lockdowns for COVID-19. It did not reopen when the lockdown was lifted 3 months later, ending 83 years of continuous operation. The restaurant had planned to stay open during the middle of a move to a new location in the downtown-Chinatown area on Viger street. However, after the pandemic lockdown, it would remain closed until the new location was opened. The lease on the Boulevard Saint-Laurent location expired at the end of 2020, and the owner of the building changed hands. The Viger Avenue site off Victoria Square is on the Caisse-de-Depots-et-Placements block, in the old Houston's Restaurant location. Renovations to the site started in August 2020. It is planned to re-open at its new locale in fall 2022.

Reception and awards
The restaurant won a Wine Spectator Award of Excellence in 2011, and was named by Forbes magazine as one of the Top 10 Steakhouses in the World.

Notable clientele
Over the decades, Moishes became a draw for Montrealers of all backgrounds and walks of life. In addition to "regular" Montrealers, it has been frequented by a long list of celebrities, politicians and athletes such as Penélope Cruz, Robert De Niro, Céline Dion, Paul Newman, Sharon Stone, Robert Downey Jr. and Don Rickles. Karol Wojtyla, who would later become Pope John Paul II, ate there while still a Cardinal.

References

Additional sources
  
 Weintraub, William (1996). City Unique: Montreal Days and Nights in the 1940s and 50s. McClelland & Stewart.

External links
 Official website
 10 Best listing and reviews
 Review from Lesleychesterman.com

Ashkenazi Jewish culture in Montreal
Jewish Canadian cuisine
Jews and Judaism in Montreal
Le Plateau-Mont-Royal
Restaurants established in 1938
Restaurants in Montreal
Romanian-Canadian history
Steakhouses
Romanian-Jewish culture in Canada